The Ninety-Nines: International Organization of Women Pilots, also known as The 99s, is an international organization that provides networking, mentoring, and flight scholarship opportunities to recreational and professional female pilots. Founded in 1929, the
Ninety-Nines has 153 chapters and 27 regional 'sections' across the globe as of 2022, including a 'virtual' chapter, Ambassador 99s, which meets online for those who are too busy or mobile to be in one region for long.

Amelia Earhart was elected as their first president in 1931, and the organization has continued to make a significant impact supporting the advancement of women in aviation since its inception. In 1982, the Ninety-Nines received the National Aviation Hall of Fame Spirit of Flight Award, and were inducted into the Oklahoma Air Space Museum Hall of Fame in 2001. In 2002, the organization was selected as the recipient of the Frank G. Brewer Trophy by the National Aeronautic Association, and in 2014 became inducted into the International Air & Space Hall of Fame at the San Diego Air & Space Museum.

History
In August 1929, a small group of female pilots met informally in Cleveland, Ohio following the United States Women's Air Derby, and that group agreed that there was a need to form an organization to support women in the burgeoning field of aviation. Invitations to an initial meeting at a later date were sent out to all 117 female pilots licensed at the time.  On November 2, 1929, the organization was founded at  Curtiss Field near Valley Stream, New York by 26 licensed female pilots for the mutual support and advancement of "Women Pilots."  At the suggestion of Amelia Earhart, the organization's name was taken from the number of charter members, eventually settling on "Ninety-Nines."

Membership
Charter members include:

 Amelia Earhart
(president 1931–1933)
 Mary C. Alexander
 Ruth Elder
 Viola Gentry
 Fay Gillis
 Mary Goodrich
 Florence Klingensmith
 Opal Kunz
 Ila Loetscher
 Ruth Rowland Nichols
 Phoebe Omlie
 Thea Rasche
 Marjorie Stinson
 Louise Thaden
 Mary Webb Nicholson
 Helen Cox Bikle 
 Nellie Zabel Willhite

Other notable members include:

 Margaret Adams
 Ruth Alexander
 Suzie Azar
 Pancho Barnes
 Janet Zaph Briggs
 Maie Casey, Baroness Casey
 Katherine Sui Fun Cheung
 Jackie Cochran
(president 1941–1943)
 Eileen Collins
 Marjorie Crawford
 Betty Gillies
 Linda M. Godwin
 Kathryn Hach-Darrow
 Nancy Hopkins
 Elvy Kalep
 Peggy Kelman
 Theresa M. Korn
 Dot Lemon
 Elsie MacGill
 Anésia Pinheiro Machado
 Pamela Melroy
 Betty Miller (pilot)
 Terry Neese
 Norah O'Neill
 Dorothy Rungeling
 Sheila Scott
 Katharine Stinson
 Jane Straughan
 Manila Davis Talley
 Penny Thompson
 Bobbi Trout
 Hermelinda Urvina
 Patty Wagstaff
 Shannon Walker
 Nancy-Bird Walton
 Jessie E. Woods
 Edna Gardner Whyte
(president 1955–1957)
 Jeana Yeager

Charter member Margaret Thomas "Tommy" Warren believes she might have been the youngest charter member of the 99's — being only 17 when she joined. She was not present at the first gathering of women aviators on Long Island in October 1929, but did go to New York with Frances Harrell for the second meeting on December 14 at the home of Opal Kunz, and was appointed to represent Texas. 

The Ninety-Nines, Inc. is a non-profit 501(c)3 organization, and as of 2017 has 5,159 members in 30 countries. The mission of the Ninety-Nines is to promote world fellowship through flight, provide networking and scholarship opportunities for women in aviation, foster aviation education opportunities in the community, and preserve the unique history of women in aviation. The organization is divided into "sections" that are part of geographical areas covering multiple states in the continental U.S. and outlying territories, provinces in Canada, and regions of countries in continents across the globe. Chapters are the smallest grouping, often representing large cities or metropolitan areas under their geographical "sections".

Historical initiatives 
Efforts of members which significantly contributed to the documentation, preservation and publication of The Ninety-Nines historical records and museum contributions include those of Virginia Thompson, who joined the organization in 1954. Thompson became the first Historian of the Mid-Atlantic Section (formerly the Middle-East Section), a founding member and Chairman of the Washington D.C. Chapter, and eventually the Mid-Atlantic Section Governor during a pivotal time in U.S. History leading up to the Kennedy Administration and boom of the United States Aerospace Industry.  

On July 26 1963, Thompson, along with five other female aviators (including charter member and former Ninety-Nines International President, Blanche Noyes ) accompanied President John F. Kennedy as he personally honored aviatrixes during the Amelia Earhart First Day Cover presentation at the White House. In addition to founding the Shenandoah Valley Chapter, Thompson served as International Historian of the Ninety-Nines for many years, and was Secretary of the International Women's Air and Space Museum, and a Smithsonian archivist. For nearly 65 years, Virginia Thompson was an active member of The Ninety-Nines until her passing in 2019.

Scholarship fund
The Ninety-Nines Amelia Earhart Memorial Scholarship Fund (AEMSF) program assists in funding flight training, technical training or academics for both recreational and career track women pilots by awarding scholarships to qualified members. The AEMSF "First Wings" award is a progressive milestone scholarship of up to $6,000 to assist a student pilot Ninety-Nine in completing her Private Pilot training. In addition to the AEMSF program, many individual chapters of the Ninety-Nines give their own flight scholarships to benefit local woman aviators.

For Aspiring Professional Pilots 
Aspiring professional or new commercial pilots can find career guidance and mentorship in the Ninety-Nines "Professional Pilot Leadership Initiative" program.

Museums and activities

Amelia Earhart Birthplace Museum
The Ninety-Nines are owner-custodians of the Amelia Earhart Birthplace Museum in Atchison, Kansas. The birthplace and early childhood home of early aviator Amelia Earhart has been listed on the National Register of Historic Places and has been returned to its turn-of-the-century condition by the "99s"; it features an abundance of personal and family memorabilia.

99s Museum of Women Pilots
Their international headquarters building on Will Rogers World Airport in Oklahoma City, Oklahoma, is home to the 99s Museum of Women Pilots. Museum artifacts include historical papers, personal items, video and oral histories, photos, memorabilia and other notable artifacts from famed woman aviators from around the globe. The museum collection and exhibits provide insight into the role women pilots played in the development of aviation and their historical footprint.

Activities
Ninety-Nines members support the goals of the organization by being active in numerous aviation activities, including : aviation education seminars in the community, air racing, from the Powder Puff Derby to the Palms to Pines and the Air Race Classic; and airmarking by volunteering their time to paint airport names, compass rose symbols and other identifications on airports and the National Intercollegiate Flying Association (NIFA). Most regional and national NIFA competitions have "99s" on their panels of judges.

See also 
New Hampshire Historical Marker No. 268: Bernice Blake Perry (1905–1996), honoring a charter member of the Ninety-Nines

References

External links 
 Official Website of The Ninety-Nines, Inc
 Les Ninety-Nines France French Section
 

1929 establishments in New York (state)
Aviation organizations based in the United States
Aviation-related professional associations
Feminist organizations in the United States
International professional associations
Organizations based in Oklahoma City
Organizations based in New York (state)
Organizations established in 1929
Professional associations for women
Valley Stream, New York
Women aviators